In chemistry, a nonmetal (or non-metal) is a chemical element that generally lacks a predominance of metallic properties; they range from colorless gases (like hydrogen) to shiny solids (like carbon, as graphite). The electrons in nonmetals behave differently from those in metals; with some exceptions, the electrons in nonmetals are fixed in place, resulting in nonmetals usually being poor conductors of heat and electricity, and brittle or crumbly when solid. The electrons in metals are generally free-moving and this is why metals are good conductors and most are easily flattened into sheets and drawn into wires. Nonmetal atoms tend to attract electrons in chemical reactions and to form acidic compounds.

Two nonmetals, hydrogen and helium, make up about 99 percent of ordinary matter in the observable universe by mass. Five nonmetallic elements, hydrogen, carbon, nitrogen, oxygen and silicon, largely make up the Earth's crust, atmosphere, oceans and biosphere.

Most nonmetals have biological, technological or domestic applications. Living organisms are composed almost entirely of the nonmetals hydrogen, oxygen, carbon, and nitrogen. Nearly all nonmetals have individual uses in medicine,  pharmaceuticals, lighting, lasers, and household items.

While the term non-metallic dates from as far back as 1566, there is no widely agreed precise definition of a nonmetal. Some elements have a marked mixture of metallic and nonmetallic properties, which of these borderline cases are counted as nonmetals varies on the classification criteria. Fourteen elements are always recognized as nonmetals and nine other elements partially qualify as nonmetals.

Definition and applicable elements
A nonmetal is a chemical element deemed to lack a preponderance of metallic properties such as luster, deformability, good thermal and electrical conductivity and the capacity to form a basic (rather than acidic) oxide. Since there is no rigorous definition of a nonmetal, some variation exists among sources as to which elements are classified as such. The decisions involved depend on which property or properties are regarded as most indicative of nonmetallic or metallic character.

Although Steudel, in 2020, recognised twenty-three elements as nonmetals, any such list is open to challenge. Fourteen almost always recognized are hydrogen, oxygen, nitrogen, and sulfur; the highly reactive halogens fluorine, chlorine, bromine, and iodine; and the noble gases helium, neon, argon, krypton, xenon, and radon (see e.g. Larrañaga et al). The authors recognized carbon, phosphorus and selenium as nonmetals; Vernon had earlier reported that these three elements were instead sometimes counted as metalloids. The elements commonly recognized as metalloids namely boron; silicon and germanium; arsenic and antimony; and tellurium are sometimes counted as an intermediate class between the metals and the nonmetals when the criteria used to distinguish between metals and nonmetals are inconclusive. At other times they are counted as nonmetals in light of their nonmetallic chemistry.

Of the 118 known elements no more than about 20% are regarded as nonmetals. The status of a few elements is less certain. Astatine, the fifth halogen, is often ignored on account of its rarity and intense radioactivity; theory and experimental evidence suggest it is a metal. The superheavy elements copernicium (Z = 112), flerovium (114), and oganesson (118) may turn out to be nonmetals; their status has not been confirmed.

General properties

Physical
Physical properties apply to elements in their most stable forms in ambient conditions

About half of nonmetallic elements are gases; most of the rest are shiny solids. Bromine, the only liquid, is so volatile that it is usually topped by a layer of its fumes; sulfur is the only colored solid nonmetal. The fluid nonmetals have very low densities, melting points and boiling points, and are poor conductors of heat and electricity. The solid elements have low densities, are brittle or crumbly with low mechanical and structural strength, and poor to good conductors.

The internal structures and bonding arrangements of the nonmetals explain their differences in form. Those existing as discrete atoms (e.g. xenon) or molecules (e.g. oxygen, sulfur and bromine) have low melting and boiling points as they are held together by weak London dispersion forces acting between their atoms or molecules. Many are gases at room temperature. Nonmetals that form giant structures, such as chains of up to 1,000 atoms (e.g. selenium), sheets (e.g. carbon) or 3D lattices (e.g. silicon), have higher melting and boiling points, as it takes more energy to overcome their stronger covalent bonds, so they are all solids. Those closer to the left side of the periodic table, or further down a column, often have some weak metallic interactions between their molecules, chains, or layers, consistent with their proximity to the metals; this occurs in boron, carbon, phosphorus, arsenic, selenium, antimony, tellurium and iodine.

Nonmetallic elements are either shiny, colored, or colorless. For boron, graphitic carbon, silicon, black phosphorus, germanium, arsenic, selenium, antimony, tellurium and iodine, their structures feature varying degrees of delocalised electrons that scatter incoming visible light, resulting in a shiny appearance. The colored nonmetals (sulfur, fluorine, chlorine, bromine) absorb some colours (wavelengths) and transmit the complementary colours. For chlorine, its "familiar yellow-green colour...is due to a broad region of absorption in the violet and blue regions of the spectrum". For the colorless nonmetals (hydrogen, nitrogen, oxygen, and the noble gases) their electrons are held sufficiently strongly such that no absorption occurs in the visible part of the spectrum, and all visible light is transmitted.

The electrical and thermal conductivities of nonmetals and the brittle nature of the solids are likewise related to their internal arrangements. Whereas good conductivity and plasticity (malleability, ductility) are ordinarily associated with the presence of free moving and uniformly distributed electrons in metals the electrons in nonmetals typically lack such mobility. Among the nonmetallic elements, good electrical and thermal conductivity occurs only in carbon, arsenic and antimony. Good thermal conductivity otherwise occurs only in boron, silicon, phosphorus, and germanium; such conductivity is transmitted though vibrations of the crystalline lattices of these elements. Moderate electrical conductivity occurs in boron, silicon, phosphorus, germanium, selenium, tellurium and iodine. Plasticity occurs in limited circumstances only in carbon, phosphorus, sulfur, and selenium.

The physical differences between metals and nonmetals arise from internal and external atomic forces. Internally, the positive charge arising from the protons in an atom's nucleus acts to hold the atom's outer electrons in place. Externally, the same electrons are subject to attractive forces from the protons in nearby atoms. When the external forces are greater than, or equal to, the internal force, outer electrons are expected to become free to move between atoms, and metallic properties are predicted. Otherwise nonmetallic properties are expected.

Chemical

Nonmetals have moderate to high values of electronegativity and tend to form acidic compounds. For example, the solid nonmetals (including metalloids) react with nitric acid to form either an acid, or an oxide that has acidic properties predominating.

They tend to gain or share electrons when they react, unlike metals which tend to donate electrons. Given the stability of the electron configurations of the noble gases (which have full outer shells), nonmetals generally gain enough electrons to give them the electron configuration of the following noble gas, whereas metals tend to lose electrons sufficient to leave them with the electron configuration of the preceding noble gas. For nonmetallic elements this tendency is summarized in the duet and octet rules of thumb (and for metals there is a less rigorously predictive 18-electron rule).

Nonmetals mostly have higher ionization energies, electron affinities, electronegativity values, and standard reduction potentials than metals. In general, the higher these values the more nonmetallic is the element.

The chemical differences between metals and nonmetals largely arise from the attractive force between the positive nuclear charge of an individual atom and its negatively charged outer electrons. From left to right across each period of the periodic table the nuclear charge increases as the number of protons in the atomic nucleus increases. There is an associated reduction in atomic radius as the increasing nuclear charge draws the outer electrons closer to the core. In metals, the effect of the nuclear charge is generally weaker than for nonmetallic elements. In bonding, metals therefore tend to lose electrons, and form positively charged or polarized atoms or ions whereas nonmetals tend to gain those same electrons due to their stronger nuclear charge, and form negatively charged ions or polarized atoms.

The number of compounds formed by nonmetals is vast. The first ten places in a "top 20" table of elements most frequently encountered in 895,501,834 compounds, as listed in the Chemical Abstracts Service register for November 2, 2021, were occupied by nonmetals. Hydrogen, carbon, oxygen and nitrogen were collectively found in the majority (80%) of compounds. Silicon, a metalloid, was in 11th place. The highest rated metal, with an occurrence frequency of 0.14%, was iron, in 12th place. A few examples of nonmetal compounds are: boric acid, used in ceramic glazes; selenocysteine, the 21st amino acid of life; phosphorus sesquisulfide (P4S3), in strike anywhere matches; and teflonn), as used in non-stick coatings for pans and other cookware.

Complications

Complicating the chemistry of the nonmetals are the anomalies seen in the first row of each periodic table block. These anomalies are prominent in hydrogen, boron (whether as a nonmetal or metalloid), carbon, nitrogen, oxygen and fluorine. In later rows they manifest as secondary periodicity or non-uniform periodic trends going down most of the p-block groups, and unusual oxidation states in the heavier nonmetals.

First row anomaly
Starting with hydrogen, the first row anomaly largely arises from the electron configurations of the elements concerned. Hydrogen is noted for the different ways it forms bonds. It most commonly forms covalent bonds. It can lose its single electron in aqueous solution, leaving behind a bare proton with tremendous polarizing power. This consequently attaches itself to the lone electron pair of an oxygen atom in a water molecule, thereby forming the basis of acid-base chemistry. A hydrogen atom in a molecule can form a second, weaker, bond with an atom or group of atoms in another molecule. Such bonding, "helps give snowflakes their hexagonal symmetry, binds DNA into a double helix; shapes the three-dimensional forms of proteins; and even raises water's boiling point high enough to make a decent cup of tea."

Hydrogen and helium, and boron to neon have unusually small atomic radii. This occurs because the 1s and 2p subshells have no inner analogues (i.e., there is no zero shell and no 1p subshell) and they therefore experience no electron repulsion effects, unlike the 3p, 4p and 5p subshells of heavier elements. Ionization energies and electronegativities among these elements are consequently higher than would otherwise be expected, having regard to periodic trends. The small atomic radii of carbon, nitrogen, and oxygen facilitate the formation of double or triple bonds.

While it would normally be expected that hydrogen and helium, on electron configuration consistency grounds, would be located atop the s-block elements, the first row anomaly in these two elements is strong enough to warrant alternative placements. Hydrogen is occasionally positioned over fluorine, in group 17 rather than over lithium in group 1. Helium is regularly positioned over neon, in group 18, rather than over beryllium, in group 2.

Secondary periodicity
Immediately after the first row of d-block metals, scandium to zinc, the 3d electrons in the p-block elements i.e., gallium (a metal), germanium, arsenic, selenium, and bromine, are not as effective at shielding the increased positive nuclear charge. A similar effect accompanies the appearance of fourteen f-block metals between barium and lutetium, ultimately resulting in smaller than expected atomic radii for the elements from hafnium (Hf) onwards. The net result, especially for the group 13–15 elements, is that there is an alternation in some periodic trends going down groups 13 to 17.

Unusual oxidation states
The larger atomic radii of the heavier group 15–18 nonmetals enable higher bulk coordination numbers, and result in lower electronegativity values that better tolerate higher positive charges. The elements involved are thereby able to exhibit oxidation states other than the lowest for their group (that is, 3, 2, 1, or 0) for example in phosphorus pentachloride (PCl5), sulfur hexafluoride (SF6), iodine heptafluoride (IF7), and xenon difluoride (XeF2).

Subclasses 

Approaches to classifying nonmetals may involve from as few as two subclasses to up to six or seven. For example, the Encyclopædia Britannica periodic table recognizes noble gases, halogens, and other nonmetals, and splits the elements commonly recognized as metalloids between "other metals" and "other nonmetals". The Royal Society of Chemistry periodic table instead uses a different color for each of its eight main groups, and nonmetals can be found in seven of these.

From right to left in periodic table terms, three or four kinds of nonmetals are more or less commonly discerned.
These are:
the relatively inert noble gases;
a set of chemically strong halogen elements—fluorine, chlorine, bromine and iodine—sometimes referred to as nonmetal halogens (the term used here) or stable halogens; 
a set of unclassified nonmetals, including elements such as hydrogen, carbon, nitrogen, and oxygen, with no widely recognized collective name; and
the chemically weak nonmetallic metalloids sometimes considered to be nonmetals and sometimes not.

Since the metalloids occupy "frontier territory", where metals meet nonmetals, their treatment varies from author to author. Some consider them separate from both metals and nonmetals; some regard them as nonmetals or as a sub-class of nonmetals. Other authors count some of them as metals, for example arsenic and antimony, due to their similarities to heavy metals.
Metalloids are here treated as nonmetals in light of their chemical behavior, and for comparative purposes.

Aside from the metalloids, some boundary fuzziness and overlapping (as occurs with classification schemes generally) can be discerned among the other nonmetal subclasses. Carbon, phosphorus, selenium, iodine border the metalloids and show some metallic character, as does hydrogen. Among the noble gases, radon is the most metallic and begins to show some cationic behavior, which is unusual for a nonmetal.

Noble gases 

Six nonmetals are classified as noble gases: helium, neon, argon, krypton, xenon, and the radioactive radon. In conventional periodic tables they occupy the rightmost column. They are called noble gases in light of their characteristically very low chemical reactivity.

They have very similar properties, with all of them being colorless, odorless, and nonflammable. With their closed outer electron shells the noble gases have feeble interatomic forces of attraction resulting in very low melting and boiling points. That is why they are all gases under standard conditions, even those with atomic masses larger than many normally solid elements.

Chemically, the noble gases have relatively high ionization energies, nil or negative electron affinities, and relatively high electronegativities. Compounds of the noble gases number in the hundreds although the list continues to grow, with most of these involving oxygen or fluorine combining with either krypton, xenon or radon.

In periodic table terms, an analogy can be drawn between the noble gases and noble metals such as platinum and gold, with the latter being similarly reluctant to enter into chemical combination. As a further example, xenon, in the +8 oxidation state, forms a pale yellow explosive oxide, XeO4, while osmium, another noble metal, forms a yellow strongly oxidizing oxide, OsO4. There are parallels too in the formulas of the oxyfluorides: XeO2F4 and OsO2F4, and XeO3F2 and OsO3F2.

About 1015 tonnes of noble gases are present in the Earth's atmosphere. Helium is additionally found in natural gas to the extent of as much as 7%. Radon diffuses out of rocks, where it is formed during the natural decay sequence of uranium and thorium. In 2014 it was reported that the Earth's core may contain about 1013 tons of xenon, in the form of stable XeFe3 and XeNi3 intermetallic compounds. This may explain why "studies of the Earth's atmosphere have shown that more than 90% of the expected amount of Xe is depleted."

Nonmetal halogens 

While the nonmetal halogens are markedly reactive and corrosive elements, they can be found in such mundane compounds as toothpaste (NaF); ordinary table salt (NaCl); swimming pool disinfectant (NaBr); or food supplements (KI). The word "halogen" means "salt former".

Physically, fluorine and chlorine are pale yellow and yellowish green gases; bromine is a reddish-brown liquid (usually topped by a layer of its fumes); and iodine, under white light, is a metallic-looking solid. Electrically, the first three are insulators while iodine is a semiconductor (along its planes).

Chemically, they have high ionization energies, electron affinities, and electronegativity values, and are mostly relatively strong oxidizing agents. Manifestations of this status include their corrosive nature. All four exhibit a tendency to form predominately ionic compounds with metals whereas the remaining nonmetals, bar oxygen, tend to form predominately covalent compounds with metals. The reactive and strongly electronegative nature of the nonmetal halogens represents the epitome of nonmetallic character.

In periodic table terms, the counterparts of the highly nonmetallic halogens in group 17 are the highly reactive alkali metals, such as sodium and potassium, in group 1. Most of the alkali metals, as if in imitation of the nonmetal halogens, are known to form –1 anions (something that rarely occurs among metals).

The nonmetal halogens are found in salt-related minerals. Fluorine occurs in fluorite (CaF2), a widespread mineral. Chlorine, bromine and iodine are found in brines. Exceptionally, a 2012 study reported the presence of 0.04% native fluorine by weight in antozonite, attributing these inclusions as a result of radiation from the presence of tiny amounts of uranium.

Unclassified nonmetals 

After the nonmetallic elements are classified as either noble gases, halogens or metalloids (following), the remaining seven nonmetals are hydrogen, carbon, nitrogen, oxygen, phosphorus, sulfur and selenium. In their most stable forms, three are colorless gases (H, N, O); three have a metal-like appearance (C, P, Se); and one is yellow (S). Electrically, graphitic carbon is a semimetal along its planes and a semiconductor in a direction perpendicular to its planes; phosphorus and selenium are semiconductors; and hydrogen, nitrogen, oxygen, and sulfur are insulators.

They are generally regarded as being too diverse to merit a collective examination, and have been referred to as other nonmetals, or more plainly as nonmetals, located between the metalloids and the halogens. Consequently, their chemistry tends to be taught disparately, according to their four respective periodic table groups, for example: hydrogen in group 1; the group 14 nonmetals (carbon, and possibly silicon and germanium); the group 15 nonmetals (nitrogen, phosphorus, and possibly arsenic and antimony); and the group 16 nonmetals (oxygen, sulfur, selenium, and possibly tellurium). Other subdivisions are possible according to the individual preferences of authors.

Hydrogen, in particular, behaves in some respects like a metal and in others like a nonmetal. Like a metal it can (first) lose its single electron; it can stand in for alkali metals in typical alkali metal structures; and is capable of forming alloy-like hydrides, featuring metallic bonding, with some transition metals. On the other hand, it is an insulating diatomic gas, like a typical nonmetal, and in chemical reactions has a tendency to eventually attain the electron configuration of helium. It does this by way of forming a covalent or ionic bond or, if it has lost its electron, attaching itself to a lone pair of electrons.

Some or all of these nonmetals nevertheless have several shared properties. Most of them, being less reactive than the halogens, can occur naturally in the environment. They have prominent biological and geochemical roles. While their physical and chemical character is "moderately non-metallic", on a net basis, all of them have corrosive aspects. Hydrogen can corrode metals. Carbon corrosion can occur in fuel cells. Acid rain is caused by dissolved nitrogen or sulfur. Oxygen corrodes iron via rust. White phosphorus, the most unstable form, ignites in air and produces phosphoric acid residue. Untreated selenium in soils can give rise to corrosive hydrogen selenide gas. When combined with metals, the unclassified nonmetals can form high hardness (interstitial or refractory) compounds, on account of their relatively small atomic radii and sufficiently low ionization energy values. They show a tendency to bond to themselves, especially in solid compounds. Diagonal periodic table relationships among these nonmetals echo similar relationships among the metalloids.

In periodic table terms, a geographic analogy is seen between the unclassified nonmetals and transition metals. The unclassified nonmetals occupy territory between the strongly nonmetallic halogens on the right and the weakly nonmetallic metalloids on the left. The transition metals occupy territory, "between the virulent and violent metals on the left of the periodic table, and the calm and contented metals to the right... [and]... form a transitional bridge between the two".

Unclassified nonmetals typically occur in elemental forms (oxygen, sulfur) or are found in association with either of these two elements:

 Hydrogen occurs in the world's oceans as a component of water, and in natural gas as a component of methane and hydrogen sulfide.
 Carbon occurs in limestone, dolomite, and marble, as carbonates. Less well known is carbon as graphite, which mainly occurs in metamorphic silicate rocks as a result of the compression and heating of sedimentary carbon compounds.
 Oxygen is found in the atmosphere; in the oceans as a component of water; and in the crust as oxide minerals.
 Phosphorus minerals are widespread, usually as phosphorus-oxygen phosphates.
 Elemental sulfur can be found in or near hot springs and volcanic regions in many parts of the world; sulfur minerals are widespread, usually as sulfides or oxygen-sulfur sulfates.
 Selenium occurs in metal sulfide ores, where it partially replaces the sulfur; elemental selenium is occasionally found.

Metalloids 

The six elements more commonly recognized as metalloids are boron, silicon, germanium, arsenic, antimony, and tellurium, each having a metallic appearance. On a standard periodic table, they occupy a diagonal area in the p-block extending from boron at the upper left to tellurium at lower right, along the dividing line between metals and nonmetals shown on some tables.

They are brittle and poor to good conductors of heat and electricity. Boron, silicon, germanium and tellurium are semiconductors. Arsenic and antimony have the electronic structures of semimetals although both have less stable semiconducting forms.

Chemically the metalloids generally behave like (weak) nonmetals. Among the nonmetallic elements they tend to have the lowest ionization energies, electron affinities, and electronegativity values, and are relatively weak oxidizing agents. They further demonstrate a tendency to form alloys with metals.

In periodic table terms, to the left of the weakly nonmetallic metalloids are an indeterminate set of weakly metallic metals (such as tin, lead and bismuth) sometimes referred to as post-transition metals. Dingle explains the situation this way:
... with 'no-doubt' metals on the far left of the table, and no-doubt non-metals on the far right... the gap between the two extremes is bridged first by the poor (post-transition) metals, and then by the metalloids—which, perhaps by the same token, might collectively be renamed the 'poor non-metals'.

The metalloids tend to be found in forms combined with oxygen or sulfur or (in the case of tellurium) gold or silver. Boron is found in boron-oxygen borate minerals including in volcanic spring waters. Silicon occurs in the silicon-oxygen mineral silica (sand). Germanium, arsenic and antimony are mainly found as components of sulfide ores. Tellurium occurs in telluride minerals of gold or silver. Native forms of arsenic, antimony and tellurium have been reported.

Allotropes

Most nonmetallic elements exist in allotropic forms. Carbon, for example, occurs as graphite, diamond and other forms. Such allotropes may exhibit physical properties that are more metallic or less nonmetallic.

Among the nonmetal halogens, and unclassified nonmetals:
 Iodine is known in a semiconducting amorphous form.
 Graphite, the standard state of carbon, is a fairly good electrical conductor. The diamond allotrope of carbon is clearly nonmetallic, being translucent and an extremely poor electrical conductor. Carbon is known in several other allotropic forms, including semiconducting buckminsterfullerene, and amorphous and paracrystalline (mixed amorphous and crystalline) varieties.
 Nitrogen can form gaseous tetranitrogen (N4), an unstable polyatomic molecule with a lifetime of about one microsecond.
 Oxygen is a diatomic molecule in its standard state; it also exists as ozone (O3), an unstable nonmetallic allotrope with an "indoors" half-life of around half an hour, compared to about three days in ambient air at 20 °C.
 Phosphorus, uniquely, exists in several allotropic forms that are more stable than its standard state as white phosphorus (P4). The white, red and black allotropes are probably the best known; the first is an insulator; the latter two are semiconductors. Phosphorus also exists as diphosphorus (P2), an unstable diatomic allotrope.
 Sulfur has more allotropes than any other element. Amorphous sulfur, a metastable mixture of such allotropes, is noted for its elasticity.
 Selenium has several nonmetallic allotropes, all of which are much less electrically conducting than its standard state of gray "metallic" selenium.

All the elements most commonly recognized as metalloids form allotropes:
 Boron is known in several crystalline and amorphous forms.
 Silicon can form crystalline (diamond-like); amorphous; and orthorhombic Si24 allotropes.
 At a pressure of about 10–11 GPa, germanium transforms to a metallic phase with the same tetragonal structure as tin. When decompressed—and depending on the speed of pressure release—metallic germanium forms a series of allotropes that are metastable in ambient conditions.
 Arsenic and antimony form several well-known allotropes (yellow, grey, and black).
 Tellurium is known in crystalline and amorphous forms.

Other allotropic forms of nonmetallic elements are known, either under pressure or in monolayers. Under sufficiently high pressures, at least half of the nonmetallic elements that are semiconductors or insulators, starting with phosphorus at 1.7 GPa, have been observed to form metallic allotropes. Single layer two-dimensional forms of nonmetals include borophene (boron), graphene (carbon), silicene (silicon), phosphorene (phosphorus), germanene (germanium), arsenene (arsenic), antimonene (antimony) and tellurene (tellurium), collectively referred to as xenes.

Prevalence and access

Abundance

Hydrogen and helium are estimated to make up approximately 99% of all ordinary matter in the universe and over 99.9% of its atoms. Oxygen is thought to be the next most abundant element, at about 0.1%. Less than five per cent of the universe is believed to be made of ordinary matter, represented by stars, planets and living beings. The balance is made of dark energy and dark matter, both of which are currently poorly understood.

Five nonmetals namely hydrogen, carbon, nitrogen, oxygen and silicon constitute the bulk of the Earth's crust, atmosphere, hydrosphere and biomass, in the quantities shown in the table.

Extraction

Nonmetals, and metalloids, are extracted in their raw forms from:
 brine—chlorine, bromine, iodine;
 liquid air—nitrogen, oxygen, neon, argon, krypton, xenon;
 minerals—boron (borate minerals); carbon (coal; diamond; graphite); fluorine (fluorite); silicon (silica); phosphorus (phosphates); antimony (stibnite, tetrahedrite); iodine (in sodium iodate and sodium iodide);
 natural gas—hydrogen, helium, sulfur; and
 ores, as processing byproducts—germanium (zinc ores); arsenic (copper and lead ores); selenium, tellurium (copper ores); and radon (uranium-bearing ores).

Cost
Day to day costs will vary depending on purity, quantity, market conditions, and supplier surcharges.

Based on the available literature as at August 2022, while the cited costs of most nonmetals are less than the $US0.80 per gram cost of silver,
boron, phosphorus, germanium, xenon, and radon (notionally) are exceptions:
Boron costs around $25 per gram for 99.7% pure polycrystalline chunks with a particle size of about 1 cm. Earlier, in 1997, boron was quoted at $280 per gram for polycrystalline 4 to 6 mm diameter rods of 99.999% purity, about ten times the then $28.35 per gram cost of gold.
In 2020 phosphorus in its most stable black form could "cost up to $1,000 per gram", more than 15 times the cost of gold, whereas ordinary red phosphorus, in 2017, was priced at about $3.40 per kilogram. Researchers hoped to be able to reduce the cost of black phosphorus to as low as $1 per gram.
Germanium and xenon cost about $1.20 and $7.60 per gram.
Up to 2013, radon was available from the National Institute of Standards and Technology for $1,636 per 0.2 ml unit of issue, equivalent to about $86,000,000 per gram, with no indication of a discount for bulk quantities.

Shared uses

Nearly all nonmetals have varying uses in household items; lighting and lasers; and medicine and pharmaceuticals. Nitrogen, for example, is found in some garden treatments; lasers; and diabetes medicines. Germanium, arsenic, and radon each have uses in one or two of these fields but not all three. Aside from the noble gases most of the remaining nonmetals have, or have had, uses in agrochemicals and dyestuffs. To the extent that metalloids show metallic character, they have speciality uses extending to (for example) oxide glasses, alloying components, and semiconductors.

Further shared uses of different subsets of the nonmetals occur in or as air replacements; cryogenics and refrigerants; fertilizers; flame retardants or fire extinguishers; mineral acids; plug-in hybrid vehicles; welding gases; and smart phones.

History, background, and taxonomy

Discovery

Most nonmetals were discovered in the 18th and 19th centuries. Before then carbon, sulfur and antimony were known in antiquity; arsenic was discovered during the Middle Ages (by Albertus Magnus); and Hennig Brand isolated phosphorus from urine in 1669. Helium (1868) holds the distinction of being the only element not first discovered on Earth. Radon is the most recently discovered nonmetal, being found only at the end of the 19th century.

Chemistry- or physics-based techniques used in the isolation efforts were spectroscopy, fractional distillation, radiation detection, electrolysis, ore acidification, displacement reactions, combustion and heating; a few nonmetals occurred naturally as free elements

Of the noble gases, helium was detected via its yellow line in the coronal spectrum of the sun, and later by observing the bubbles escaping from uranite UO2 dissolved in acid. Neon through xenon were obtained via fractional distillation of air. Radon was first observed emanating from compounds of thorium, three years after Henri Becquerel's discovery of radiation in 1896.

The nonmetal halogens were obtained from their halides via either electrolysis, adding an acid, or displacement. Some chemists died as a result of their experiments trying to isolate fluorine.

Among the unclassified nonmetals, carbon was known (or produced) as charcoal, soot, graphite and diamond; nitrogen was observed in air from which oxygen had been removed; oxygen was obtained by heating mercurous oxide; phosphorus was liberated by heating ammonium sodium hydrogen phosphate (Na(NH4)HPO4), as found in urine; sulfur occurred naturally as a free element; and selenium was detected as a residue in sulfuric acid.

Most of the elements commonly recognized as metalloids were isolated by heating their oxides (boron, silicon, arsenic, tellurium) or a sulfide (germanium). Antimony was known in its native form as well as being attainable by heating its sulfide.

Origin of the concept
The distinction between metals and nonmetals arose, in a convoluted manner, from a crude recognition of different kinds of matter namely pure substances, mixtures, compounds and elements. Thus, matter could be divided into pure substances (such as salt, bicarb of soda, or sulfur) and mixtures (aqua regia, gunpowder, or bronze, for example) and pure substances eventually could be distinguished as compounds and elements. "Metallic" elements then seemed to have broadly distinguishable attributes that other elements did not, such as their ability to conduct heat or for their "earths" (oxides) to form basic solutions in water, for example as occurred with quicklime (CaO).

Use of the term
The term nonmetallic dates from as far back as 1566. In a medical treatise published that year, Loys de L’Aunay (a French doctor) mentioned the properties of plant substances from metallic and "non-metallic" lands.

In early chemistry, Wilhelm Homberg (a German natural philosopher) referred to "non-metallic" sulfur in Des Essais de Chimie (1708). Homberg's approach represented "an important move toward the modern concept of an element".

Lavoisier, in his "revolutionary" 1789 work Traité élémentaire de chimie, published the first modern list of chemical elements in which he distinguished between gases, metals, nonmetals, and earths (heat resistant oxides). In its first seventeen years, Lavoisier's work was republished in twenty-three editions in six languages, and "carried ... [his] new chemistry all over Europe and America."

Suggested distinguishing criteria

In 1809, Humphry Davy's discovery of sodium and potassium "annihilated" the line of demarcation between metals and nonmetals. Before then metals had been distinguished on the basis of their ponderousness or relatively high densities. Sodium and potassium, on the other hand, floated on water and yet were clearly metals on the basis of their chemical behaviour.

From as early as 1811, different properties—physical, chemical, and electron related—have been used in attempts to refine the distinction between metals and nonmetals. The accompanying table sets out 22 such properties, by type and date order.

Probably the most well-known property is that the electrical conductivity of a metal increases when temperature falls whereas that of a non-metal rises. However this scheme does not work for plutonium, carbon, arsenic and antimony. Plutonium, which is a metal, increases its electrical conductivity when heated in the temperature range of around –175 to +125 °C. Carbon, despite being widely regarded as a nonmetal, likewise increases its conductivity when heated. Arsenic and antimony are sometimes classified as nonmetals yet act similarly to carbon.

Kneen et al. suggested that the nonmetals could be discerned once a [single] criterion for metallicity had been chosen, adding that, "many arbitrary classifications are possible, most of which, if chosen reasonably, would be similar but not necessarily identical." Emsley noted that, "No single property... can be used to classify all the elements as either metals or nonmetals." Jones added that "classes are usually defined by more than two attributes".

{|class="wikitable floatright" style="line-height: 1.3; font-size: 95%; margin-top:1.2em; margin-left:20px"
|+ The first 99 elements sorted bydensity and electronegativity (EN)
|-
| style="background:white; border-top:1px solid white; border-left:1px solid white;"|  ||colspan=2 style="text-align: center"|EN
|-
|style="vertical-align:top; column-width:2em"| Density ||style="vertical-align:top; column-width:12em"|  < 1.9  ||style="vertical-align:top; column-width:12em"| ≥ 1.9'|-
| < 7 gm/cm3|| Groups 1 and 2Sc, Y, LaCe, Pr, Eu, YbTi, Zr, V; Al, Ga ||style="vertical-align:top"| Noble gasesF, Cl, Br, IH, C, N, P, O, S, SeB, Si, Ge, As, Sb, Te
|-
| > 7 gm/cm3|| Nd, Pm, Sm, Gd, Tb, DyHo, Er, Tm, Lu; Ac–Es;Hf, Nb, Ta; Cr, Mn, Fe,Co, Zn, Cd, In, Tl, Pb || style="vertical-align:top"|Ni, Mo, W, Tc, Re,Platinum group metals,Coinage metals, Hg; Sn,Bi, Po, At
|}
Johnson suggested that physical properties can best indicate the metallic or nonmetallic properties of an element, with the proviso that other properties will be needed in ambiguous cases. He observed that all gaseous or nonconducting elements are nonmetals; solid nonmetals metals are hard and brittle or soft and crumbly whereas metals are usually malleable and ductile; and nonmetal oxides are acidic.

According to Hein and Arena, nonmetals have low densities and relatively high electronegativity; the accompanying table bears this out. Nonmetallic elements occupy the top left quadrant, where densities are low and electronegativity values are relatively high. The other three quadrants are occupied by metals. Some authors further divide the elements into metals, metalloids, and nonmetals although Odberg argues that anything not a metal is, on categorisation grounds, a nonmetal.

Development of subclasses
A basic taxonomy of nonmetals was set out in 1844, by Alphonse Dupasquier, a French doctor, pharmacist and chemist. To facilitate the study of nonmetals, he wrote:

They will be divided into four groups or sections, as in the following:
Organogens O, N, H, C
Sulphuroids S, Se, P
Chloroides F, Cl, Br, I
Boroids B, Si.

An echo of Dupasquier's fourfold classification is seen in the modern subclasses. The organogens and sulphuroids represent the set of unclassified nonmetals. Varying configurations of these seven nonmetals have been referred to as, for example, basic nonmetals; biogens; central nonmetals; CHNOPS; essential elements; "nonmetals"; orphan nonmetals; or redox nonmetals.
The chloroide nonmetals came to be independently referred to as halogens. The boroid nonmetals expanded into the metalloids, starting from as early as 1864. The noble gases, as a discrete grouping, were counted among the nonmetals from as early as 1900.

Comparison
Some properties of metals, and of metalloids, unclassified nonmetals, nonmetal halogens, and noble gases are summarized in the table. Physical properties apply to elements in their most stable forms in ambient conditions, and are listed in loose order of ease of determination. Chemical properties are listed from general to descriptive, and then to specific. The dashed line around the metalloids denotes that, depending on the author, the elements involved may or may not be recognized as a distinct class or subclass of elements. Metals are included as a reference point.

Most properties show a left-to-right progression in metallic to nonmetallic character or average values. The periodic table can thus be indicatively divided into metals and nonmetals, with more or less distinct gradations seen among the nonmetals.

See also
 CHON (carbon, hydrogen, oxygen, nitrogen)
 List of nonmetal monographs
 Metallization pressure
 Period 1 elements (hydrogen, helium)
 Properties of nonmetals (and metalloids) by group

Notes

References
Citations

Bibliography

 Abbott D 1966, An Introduction to the Periodic Table, J. M. Dent & Sons, London
 Atkins PA 2001, The Periodic Kingdom: A Journey Into the Land of the Chemical Elements, Phoenix, London, 
 Atkins PA et al. 2006, Shriver & Atkins' Inorganic Chemistry, 4th ed., Oxford University Press, Oxford, 
 Atkins PA & Overton T 2010, Shriver & Atkins' Inorganic Chemistry, 5th ed., Oxford University Press, Oxford, 
Aylward G and Findlay T 2008, SI Chemical Data, 6th ed., John Wiley & Sons Australia, Milton, 
 Bailar JC et al. 1989, Chemistry, 3rd ed., Harcourt Brace Jovanovich, San Diego, 
 Barton AFM 2021, States of Matter, States of Mind, CRC Press, Boca Raton, 
 Beach FC (ed.) 1911, The Americana: A universal reference library, vol. XIII, Mel–New, Metalloid, Scientific American Compiling Department, New York
 Benner SA, Ricardo A & Carrigan MA 2018, "Is there a common chemical model for life in the universe?", in Cleland CE & Bedau MA (eds.), The Nature of Life: Classical and Contemporary Perspectives from Philosophy and Science, Cambridge University Press, Cambridge, 
 Berger LI 1997, Semiconductor Materials, CRC Press, Boca Raton, 
 Bertomeu-Sánchez JR, Garcia-Belmar A & Bensaude-Vincent B 2002, "Looking for an order of things: Textbooks and chemical classifications in nineteenth century France", Ambix, vol. 49, no. 3, 
 Berzelius JJ & Bache AD 1832, "An essay on chemical nomenclature, prefixed to the treatise on chemistry", The American Journal of Science and Arts, vol. 22
 Bodner GM & Pardue HL 1993, Chemistry, An Experimental Science, John Wiley & Sons, New York, 
 Bogoroditskii NP & Pasynkov VV 1967, Radio and Electronic Materials, Iliffe Books, London
 Bohlmann R 1992, "Synthesis of halides", in Winterfeldt E (ed.), Heteroatom manipulation, Pergamon Press, Oxford, 
 Boise State University 2020, "Cost-effective manufacturing methods breathe new life into black phosphorus research", Micron School of Materials Science and Engineering, accessed July 9, 2021
 Borg RG & Dienes GJ 1992, The Physical Chemistry of Solids, Academic Press, Boston, 
  Boyd R 2011, "Selenium stories", Nature Chemistry, vol. 3, 
 Brady JE & Senese F 2009, Chemistry: The study of Matter and its Changes, 5th ed., John Wiley & Sons, New York, 
 Brande WT 1821, A Manual of Chemistry, vol. II, John Murray, London
 Brodsky MH, Gambino RJ, Smith JE Jr & Yacoby Y 1972, "The Raman spectrum of amorphous tellurium", Physica Status Solidi B, vol. 52, 
 Brown TL et al. 2014, Chemistry: The Central Science, 3rd ed., Pearson Australia: Sydney, 
 Burford N, Passmore J & Sanders JCP 1989, "The preparation, structure, and energetics of homopolyatomic cations of groups 16 (the chalcogens) and 17 (the halogens), in Liebman JF & Greenberg A, From atoms to polymers : isoelectronic analogies, VCH: New York, 
 Cacace F, de Petris G & Troiani A 2002, "Experimental detection of tetranitrogen", Science, vol. 295, no. 5554, 
 Cao C et al. 2021, "Understanding periodic and non-periodic chemistry in periodic tables", Frontiers in Chemistry, vol. 8, no. 813, 
 Carapella SC 1968, "Arsenic" in Hampel CA (ed.), The Encyclopedia of the Chemical Elements, Reinhold, New York
 Carmalt CJ & Norman NC 1998, 'Arsenic, Antimony and Bismuth: Some General Properties and Aspects of Periodicity', in NC Norman (ed.), Chemistry of Arsenic, Antimony and Bismuth, Blackie Academic & Professional, London, pp. 1–38, 
 Challoner J 2014, The Elements: The New Guide to the Building Blocks of our Universe, Carlton Publishing Group, 
 Chambers E 1743, in "Metal", Cyclopedia: Or an Universal Dictionary of Arts and Sciences (etc.), vol. 2, D Midwinter, London
 Chambers C & Holliday AK 1982, Inorganic Chemistry, Butterworth & Co., London, 
 Charlier J-C, Gonze X, Michenaud J-P 1994, First-principles Study of the Stacking Effect on the Electronic Properties of Graphite(s), Carbon, vol. 32, no. 2, pp. 289–99, 
 Chemical Abstracts Service 2021, CAS REGISTRY database as of November 2, Case #01271182
 Cherim SM 1971, Chemistry for Laboratory Technicians, Saunders, Philadelphia, 
 Chung DD 1987, "Review of exfoliated graphite", Journal of Materials Science, vol. 22, 
 Clugston MJ & Flemming R 2000, Advanced Chemistry, Oxford University Press, Oxford, 
 Cockell C 2019, The Equations of Life: How Physics Shapes Evolution, Atlantic Books, London, 
 Cook CG 1923, Chemistry in Everyday Life: With Laboratory Manual, D Appleton, New York
 Cotton A et al. 1999, Advanced Inorganic Chemistry, 6th ed., Wiley, New York, 
 Cousins DM, Davidson MG & García-Vivó D 2013, "Unprecedented participation of a four-coordinate hydrogen atom in the cubane core of lithium and sodium phenolates", Chemical Communications, vol. 49, 
 Cox AN (ed.) 2000, Allen's Astrophysical Quantities, 4th ed., AIP Press, New York, 
 Cox PA 1997, The Elements: Their Origins, Abundance, and Distribution, Oxford University Press, Oxford, 
 Cox T 2004, Inorganic Chemistry, 2nd ed., BIOS Scientific Publishers, London, 
 Crawford FH 1968, Introduction to the Science of Physics, Harcourt, Brace & World, New York
 Crichton R 2012, Biological Inorganic Chemistry: A New Introduction to Molecular Structure and Function, 2nd ed., Elsevier, Amsterdam, 
 Cressey D 2010, "Chemists re-define hydrogen bond", Nature newsblog, accessed August 23, 2017
 Criswell B 2007, "Mistake of having students be Mendeleev for just a day", Journal of Chemical Education, vol. 84, no. 7, pp. 1140–1144, 
 Dalton L 2019, "Argon reacts with nickel under pressure-cooker conditions", Chemical & Engineering News, accessed November 6, 2019
 Daniel PL & Rapp RA 1976, "Halogen corrosion of metals", in Fontana MG & Staehle RW (eds.), Advances in Corrosion Science and Technology, Springer, Boston, 
 de Clave E 1641, New Philosophical Light of True Principles and Elements of Nature, Olivier Devarennes, Paris, accessed February 24, 2022
 de L'Aunay L 1566, Responce au discours de maistre Iacques Grevin, docteur de Paris, qu'il a escript contre le livre de maistre Loys de l'Aunay, medecin en la Rochelle, touchant la faculté de l'antimoine (Response to the Speech of Master Jacques Grévin,... Which He Wrote Against the Book of Master Loys de L'Aunay,... Touching the Faculty of Antimony), De l'Imprimerie de Barthelemi Berton, La Rochelle
 Desai PD, James HM & Ho CY 1984, "Electrical Resistivity of Aluminum and Manganese", Journal of Physical and Chemical Reference Data, vol. 13, no. 4, 
 Dingle A 2017, The Elements: An Encyclopedic Tour of the Periodic Table, Quad Books, Brighton, 
 Donohue J 1982, The Structures of the Elements, Robert E. Krieger, Malabar, Florida, 
 Du Y, Ouyang C, Shi S & Lei M 2010, 'Ab Initio Studies on Atomic and Electronic Structures of Black Phosphorus', Journal of Applied Physics, vol. 107, no. 9, pp. 093718–1–4, 
 Dupasquier A 1844, Traité élémentaire de chimie industrielle, Charles Savy Juene, Lyon.
 Ebbing DD & Gammon SD 2007, General Chemistry, 9th ed., Houghton Miffllin, Boston, 
 Edelstein NM & Morrs LR 2009, "Chemistry of the Actinide elements", in Nagy S (ed.), Radiochemistry and Nuclear Chemistry: Volume II, Encyclopedia of Life Support Systems, EOLSS Publishers, Oxford, pp. 118–176, 
 Edwards PP 2000, "What, why and when is a metal?", in Hall N (ed.), The New Chemistry, Cambridge University, Cambridge, pp. 85–114, 
 Edwards PP et al. 2010, "... a metal conducts and a non-metal doesn’t", Philosophical Transactions of the Royal Society A, 2010, vol, 368, no. 1914, 
 Edwards PP & Sienko MJ 1983, "On the occurrence of metallic character in the periodic table of the elements", Journal of Chemical Education, vol. 60, no. 9, 
 Elatresh SF & Bonev SA 2020, "Stability and metallization of solid oxygen at high pressure", Physical Chemistry Chemical Physics, vol. 22, no. 22, 
 Emsley J 1971, The Inorganic Chemistry of the Non-metals, Methuen Educational, London, 
 Emsley J 2011, Nature's Building Blocks: An A–Z Guide to the Elements, Oxford University Press, Oxford, 
 Encyclopædia Britannica 2021, Periodic table, accessed September 21, 2021
 Errandonea D 2020, "Pressure-induced phase transformations," Crystals, vol. 10, 
 Evans RC 1966, An Introduction to Crystal Chemistry, 2nd ed., Cambridge University, Cambridge
 Faraday M 1853, The Subject Matter of a Course of Six Lectures on the Non-metallic Elements, (arranged by John Scoffern), Longman, Brown, Green, and Longmans, London
 Florez et al. 2022, From the gas phase to the solid state: The chemical bonding in the superheavy element flerovium, The Journal of Chemical Physics, vol. 157, 064304, 
 Fortescue JAC 2012, Environmental Geochemistry: A Holistic Approach, Springer-Verlag, New York, 
 Fraps GS 1913, Principles of Agricultural Chemistry, The Chemical Publishing Company, Easton, PA
 Fraústo da Silva JJR & Williams RJP 2001, The Biological Chemistry of the Elements: The Inorganic Chemistry of Life, 2nd ed., Oxford University Press, Oxford, 
 Gaffney J & Marley N 2017, General Chemistry for Engineers, Elsevier, Amsterdam, 
 Gargaud M et al. (eds.) 2006, Lectures in Astrobiology, vol. 1, part 1: The Early Earth and Other Cosmic Habitats for Life, Springer, Berlin, 
 Glinka N 1958, General chemistry, Sobolev D (trans.), Foreign Languages Publishing House, Moscow
 Godfrin H & Lauter HJ 1995, "Experimental properties of 3He adsorbed on graphite", in Halperin WP (ed.), Progress in Low Temperature Physics, volume 14, Elsevier Science B.V., Amsterdam, 
Godovikov AA & Nenasheva N 2020, Structural-chemical Systematics of Minerals, 3rd ed., Springer, Cham, Switzerland, 
 Goodrich BG 1844, A Glance at the Physical Sciences, Bradbury, Soden & Co., Boston
 Government of Canada 2015, Periodic table of the elements, accessed August 30, 2015
 Greenwood NN & Earnshaw A 2002, Chemistry of the Elements, 2nd ed., Butterworth-Heinemann, 
 Grochala W 2018, "On the position of helium and neon in the Periodic Table of Elements", Foundations of Chemistry, vol. 20, pp. 191–207, 
 Gusmão R, Sofer Z & Pumera M 2017, "Black phosphorus rediscovered: From bulk material to monolayers", Angewandte Chemie International Edition, vol. 56, no. 28, 
 Hampel CA & Hawley GG 1976, Glossary of Chemical Terms, Van Nostrand Reinhold, New York, 
 Hanley JJ & Koga KT 2018, "Halogens in terrestrial and cosmic geochemical systems: Abundances, geochemical behaviours, and analytical methods" in The Role of Halogens in Terrestrial and Extraterrestrial Geochemical Processes: Surface, Crust, and Mantle, Harlov DE & Aranovich L (eds.), Springer, Cham, 
 Hare RA & Bache F 1836, Compendium of the Course of Chemical Instruction in the Medical Department of the University of Pennsylvania, 3rd ed., JG Auner, Philadelphia
 Hengeveld R & Fedonkin MA 2007, "Bootstrapping the energy flow in the beginning of life", Acta Biotheoretica, vol. 55, 
 Herman ZS 1999, "The nature of the chemical bond in metals, alloys, and intermetallic compounds, according to Linus Pauling", in Maksić, ZB, Orville-Thomas WJ (eds.), 1999, Pauling's Legacy: Modern Modelling of the Chemical Bond, Elsevier, Amsterdam, 
 Hermann A, Hoffmann R & Ashcroft NW 2013, "Condensed Astatine: Monatomic and metallic", Physical Review Letters, vol. 111, 
 Hérold A 2006, "An arrangement of the chemical elements in several classes inside the periodic table according to their common properties", Comptes Rendus Chimie, vol. 9, no. 1, 
 Herzfeld K 1927, "On atomic properties which make an element a metal", Physical Review, vol. 29, no. 5, 
 Hill G & Holman J 2000, Chemistry in Context, 5th ed., Nelson Thornes, Cheltenham, 
 Hill G, Holman J & Hulme PG 2017, Chemistry in Context, 7th ed., Oxford University Press, Oxford, 
 Holderness A & Berry M 1979, Advanced Level Inorganic Chemistry, 3rd ed., Heinemann Educational Books, London, 
 Höll, Kling & Schroll E 2007, "Metallogenesis of germanium—A review", Ore Geology Reviews, vol. 30, nos. 3–4, pp. 145–180, 
 Homberg W 1708, "Des Essais de Chimie", in Histoire De L'Academie Royale Des Sciences: Avec les Memoires de Mathematique & de Physique, L'Académie, Paris
 Horvath AL 1973, "Critical temperature of elements and the periodic system", Journal of Chemical Education, vol. 50, no. 5, 
 House JE 2008, Inorganic Chemistry, Elsevier, Amsterdam, 
 Housecroft CE & Sharpe AG 2008, Inorganic Chemistry, 3rd ed., Prentice-Hall, Harlow, 
 Hurlbut Jr CS 1961, Manual of Mineralogy, 15th ed., John Wiley & Sons, New York
 IUPAC Periodic Table of the Elements, accessed October 11, 2021
 Janas D, Cabrero-Vilatela, A & Bulmer J 2013, "Carbon nanotube wires for high-temperature performance", Carbon, vol. 64, pp. 305–314, 
 Jenkins GM & Kawamura K 1976, Polymeric Carbons—Carbon Fibre, Glass and Char, Cambridge University Press, Cambridge, 
 Jentzsch AV & Matile S 2015, "Anion transport with halogen bonds", in Metrangolo P & Resnati G (eds.), Halogen Bonding I: Impact on Materials Chemistry and Life Sciences, Springer, Cham,  
 Johnson D (ed.) 2007, Metals and Chemical Change, RSC Publishing, Cambridge, 
 Johnson RC 1966, Introductory Descriptive Chemistry, WA Benjamin, New York
 Jolly WL 1966, The Chemistry of the Non-metals, Prentice-Hall, Englewood Cliffs, New Jersey
 Jones BW 2010, Pluto: Sentinel of the Outer Solar System, Cambridge University, Cambridge, 
 Kaiho T 2017, Iodine Made Simple, CRC Press, e-book, 
 Keeler J & Wothers P 2013, Chemical Structure and Reactivity: An Integrated Approach, Oxford University Press, Oxford, 
 Kendall EA 1811, Pocket encyclopædia, 2nd ed., vol. III, Longman, Hurst, Rees, Orme, and Co., London
 Khan N 2001, An Introduction to Physical Geography, Concept Publishing, New Delhi, 
 Kim MG 2000, "Chemical analysis and the domains of reality: Wilhelm Homberg's Essais de chimie, 1702–1709", Studies in History and Philosophy of Science Part A, vol. 31, no. 1, pp. 37–69, 
 King RB 1994, Encyclopedia of Inorganic Chemistry, vol. 3, John Wiley & Sons, New York, 
 King RB 1995, Inorganic Chemistry of Main Group Elements, VCH, New York, 
 King GB & Caldwell WE 1954, The Fundamentals of College Chemistry, American Book Company, New York
 Kläning UK & Appelman EH 1988, "Protolytic properties of perxenic acid", Inorganic Chemistry, vol. 27, no. 21, 
 Klein U 1994, "Origin of the concept of chemical compound", Science in Context, no. 7, vol. 2, pp. 163–204, 
 Kneen WR, Rogers MJW & Simpson P 1972, Chemistry: Facts, Patterns, and Principles, Addison-Wesley, London, 
 Knight J 2002, Science of Everyday Things: Real-life chemistry, Gale Group, Detroit, 
 Kosanke et al. 2012, Encyclopedic Dictionary of Pyrotechnics (and Related Subjects), Part 3 – P to Z, Pyrotechnic Reference Series No. 5, Journal of Pyrotechnics, Whitewater, Colorado, 
 Koziel JA 2002, "Sampling and sample preparation for indoor air analysis", in Pawliszyn J (ed.), Comprehensive Analytical Chemistry, vol. 37, Elsevier Science B.V., Amsterdam, 
 Kubaschewski O 1949, "The change of entropy, volume and binding state of the elements on melting", Transactions of the Faraday Society, vol. 45, 
 Labinger JA 2019, "The history (and pre-history) of the discovery and chemistry of the noble gases", in Giunta CJ, Mainz VV & Girolami GS (eds.), 150 Years of the Periodic Table: A Commemorative Symposium, Springer Nature, Cham, Switzerland, 
 Lanford OE 1959, Using Chemistry, McGraw-Hill, New York
Langley RH & Hattori H 2014, 1,001 Practice Problems: Chemistry For Dummies, John Wiley & Sons, Hoboken, NJ, 
 Larrañaga MD, Lewis RJ & Lewis RA 2016, Hawley's Condensed Chemical Dictionary, 16th ed., Wiley, Hoboken, New York, 
 Lee JD 1996, Concise Inorganic Chemistry, 5th ed., Blackwell Science, Oxford, 
 Lewis RJ 1993, Hawley's Condensed Chemical Dictionary, 12th ed., Van Nostrand Reinhold, New York, 
 Lidin RA 1996, Inorganic Substances Handbook, Begell House, New York, 
 Liptrot GF 1983, Modern Inorganic Chemistry, 4th ed., Bell & Hyman, 
 Los Alamos National Laboratory 2021, Periodic Table of Elements: A Resource for Elementary, Middle School, and High School Students, accessed September 19, 2021
 Luchinskii GP & Trifonov DN 1981, "Some problems of chemical elements classification and the structure of the periodic system", in Uchenie o Periodichnosti. Istoriya i Sovremennoct, (Russian) Nauka, Moscow
 MacKay KM, MacKay RA & Henderson W 2002, Introduction to Modern Inorganic Chemistry, 6th ed., Nelson Thornes, Cheltenham, 
 Mackin M 2014, Study Guide to Accompany Basics for Chemistry, Elsevier Science, Saint Louis, 
 Maosheng M 2020, "Noble gases in solid compounds show a rich display of chemistry with enough pressure", Frontiers in Chemistry, vol. 8, 
 Massey AG 2000, Main group chemistry, 2nd ed., John Wiley & Sons, Chichester, 
 Masterton W, Hurley C & Neth E 2011, Chemistry: Principles and Reactions, 7th ed., Brooks/Cole, Belmont, California, 
 Matson M & Orbaek AW 2013, Inorganic Chemistry for Dummies, John Wiley & Sons: Hoboken, 
 Matula RA 1979, "Electrical resistivity of copper, gold, palladium, and silver", Journal of Physical and Chemical Reference Data, vol. 8, no. 4, 
 Mazej Z 2020, "Noble-gas chemistry more than half a century after the first report of the noble-gas compound", Molecules, vol. 25, no. 13, 
 McCue JJ 1963, World of Atoms: An Introduction to Physical Science, Ronald Press, New York
 McMillan P 2006, "A glass of carbon dioxide", Nature, vol. 441, 
 Messler Jr RW 2011, The Essence of Materials for Engineers, Jones and Bartlett Learning, Sudbury, Massachusetts, 
 Mewes et al. 2019, Copernicium: A relativistic noble liquid, Angewandte Chemie International Edition, vol. 58, pp. 17964–17968, 
 Mingos DMP 2019, "The discovery of the elements in the Periodic Table", in Mingos DMP (ed.), The Periodic Table I. Structure and Bonding, Springer Nature, Cham, 
 Moeller T et al. 2012, Chemistry: With Inorganic Qualitative Analysis, Academic Press, New York, 
 Möller D 2003, Luft: Chemie, Physik, Biologie, Reinhaltung, Recht, Walter de Gruyter, Berlin, 
 Moody B 1991, Comparative Inorganic Chemistry, 3rd ed., Edward Arnold, London, 
 Moore JT 2016, Chemistry for Dummies, 2nd ed., ch. 16, Tracking periodic trends, John Wiley & Sons: Hoboken, 
 Morita A 1986, 'Semiconducting Black Phosphorus', Journal of Applied Physics A, vol. 39, no. 4, pp. 227–42, 
 Morely HF & Muir MM 1892, Watt's Dictionary of Chemistry, vol. 3, Longman's Green, and Co., London
 Moss, TS 1952, Photoconductivity in the Elements, Butterworths Scientific, London
 Nakao Y 1992, "Dissolution of noble metals in halogen–halide–polar organic solvent systems", Journal of the Chemical Society, Chemical Communications, no. 5, 
 National Center for Biotechnology Information 2021, "PubChem compound summary for CID 402, Hydrogen sulfide", accessed August 31, 2021
 National Institute of Standards and Technology 2013, SRM 4972 – Radon-222 Emanation Standard, accessed August 1, 2021
 Nelson PG 1987, "Important elements", Journal of Chemical Education, vol. 68, no. 9, 
 Oderberg DS 2007, Real Essentialism, Routledge, New York, 
 Ostriker JP & Steinhardt PJ 2001, "The quintessential universe", Scientific American, vol. 284, no. 1, pp. 46–53 , 
 Oxtoby DW, Gillis HP & Butler LJ 2015, Principles of Modern Chemistry, 8th ed., Cengage Learning, Boston, 
 Parameswaran P et al. 2020, "Phase evolution and characterization of mechanically alloyed hexanary Al16.6Mg16.6Ni16.6Cr16.6Ti16.6Mn16.6 high entropy alloy", Metal Powder Report, vol. 75, no. 4, 
 Parish RV 1977, The Metallic Elements, Longman, London, 
 Partington JR 1944, A Text-book of Inorganic Chemistry, 5th ed., Macmillan & Co., London
Petruševski VM & Cvetković J 2018, "On the 'true position' of hydrogen in the Periodic Table", Foundations of Chemistry, vol. 20, pp. 251–260, 
 Phillips CSG & Williams RJP 1965, Inorganic Chemistry, vol. 1, Principles and non-metals, Clarendon Press, Oxford
 Phillips JC 1973, "The chemical structure of solids," in Hannay NB (ed.), Treatise on Solid State Chemistry, vol. 1, Plenum Press, New York, pp. 1–42, 
 Piro NA et al. 2006, "Triple-bond reactivity of diphosphorus molecules", Science, vol. 313, no. 5791, 
 Pitzer K 1975, "Fluorides of radon and elements 118", Journal of the Chemical Society, Chemical Communications, no. 18, 
 Porterfield WW 1993, Inorganic chemistry, Academic Press, San Diego, 
 Povh B & Rosina M 2017, Scattering and Structures: Essentials and Analogies in Quantum Physics, 2nd ed., Springer, Berlin, 
 Powell P & Timms P 1974, The Chemistry of the Non-Metals, Chapman and Hall, London, 
 Puddephatt RJ & Monaghan PK 1989, The Periodic Table of the Elements, 2nd ed., Clarendon Press, Oxford, 
 Rahm M, Zeng T & Hoffmann R 2019, "Electronegativity seen as the ground-state average valence electron binding energy", Journal of the American Chemical Society, vol. 141, no. 1, pp. 342−351, 
 Rao KY 2002, Structural Chemistry of Glasses, Elsevier, Oxford, 
 Rao CNR & Ganguly PA 1986, "New criterion for the metallicity of elements", Solid State Communications, vol. 57, no. 1, pp. 5–6, 
 Rayner-Canham G 2018, "Organizing the transition metals", in Scerri E & Restrepo G, Mendeleev to Oganesson: A multidisciplinary perspective on the periodic table, Oxford University, New York, 
 Rayner-Canham G 2020, The Periodic Table: Past, Present and Future, World Scientific, New Jersey, 
 Regnault MV 1853, Elements of Chemistry, vol. 1, 2nd ed., Clark & Hesser, Philadelphia
 Reilly C 2002, Metal Contamination of Food, Blackwell Science, Oxford, 
 Remy H 1956, Treatise on Inorganic Chemistry, Anderson JS (trans.), Kleinberg J (ed.), vol. II, Elsevier, Amsterdam
 Renouf E 1901, "Lehrbuch der anorganischen Chemie", Science, vol. 13, no. 320, 
 Restrepo G, Llanos EJ & Mesa H 2006, "Topological space of the chemical elements and its properties", Journal of Mathematical Chemistry, vol. 39, 
 Ritter SK 2011, "The case of the missing xenon", Chemical & Engineering News, vol. 89, no. 9, 
 Rochow EG 1966, The Metalloids, DC Heath and Company, Boston
 Rochow EG 1973, "Silicon", in Bailar JC et al. (eds.), Comprehensive Inorganic Chemistry, vol. 1, Pergamon Press, Oxford, 
 Rodgers GE 2012, Descriptive Inorganic, Coordination, and Solid State Chemistry, 3rd ed., Brooks/Cole, Belmont, California, 
 Royal Society of Chemistry 2021, Periodic Table: Non-metal, accessed September 3, 2021
 Rudolph J 1973, Chemistry for the Modern Mind, Macmillan, New York
 Russell AM & Lee KL 2005, Structure-Property Relations in Nonferrous Metals, Wiley-Interscience, New York, 
 Salinas JT 2019 Exploring Physical Science in the Laboratory, Moreton Publishing, Englewood, Colorado, 
 Salzberg HW 1991, From Caveman to Chemist: Circumstances and Achievements, American Chemical Society, Washington, DC, 
 Sanderson RT 1957, "An electronic distinction between metals and nonmetals", Journal of Chemical Education, vol. 34, no. 5, 
 Sanderson RT 1967, Inorganic Chemistry, Reinhold, New York
 Scerri E (ed.) 2013, 30-Second Elements: The 50 Most Significant Elements, Each Explained In Half a Minute, Ivy Press, London, 
 Schaefer JC 1968, "Boron" in Hampel CA (ed.), The Encyclopedia of the Chemical Elements, Reinhold, New York
 Schlager N & Lauer J (eds.) 2000, Science and Its Times: 1700–1799, volume 4 of Science and its times: Understanding the social significance of scientific discovery, Gale Group, 
 Schmedt auf der Günne J, Mangstl M & Kraus F 2012, "Occurrence of difluorine F2 in nature—In situ proof and quantification by NMR spectroscopy", Angewandte Chemie International Edition, vol. 51, no. 31, 
 Scott D 2014, Around the World in 18 Elements, Royal Society of Chemistry, e-book, 
 Scott EC & Kanda FA 1962, The Nature of Atoms and Molecules: A General Chemistry, Harper & Row, New York
 Seese WS & Daub GH 1985, Basic Chemistry, 4th ed., Prentice-Hall, Englewood Cliffs, NJ, 
 Segal BG 1989, Chemistry: Experiment and Theory, 2nd ed., John Wiley & Sons, New York, 
 Shanabrook BV, Lannin JS & Hisatsune IC 1981, "Inelastic light scattering in a onefold-coordinated amorphous semiconductor", Physical Review Letters, vol. 46, no. 2, 12 January, 
 Shang et al. 2021, "Ultrahard bulk amorphous carbon from collapsed fullerene", Nature, vol. 599, pp. 599–604, 
 Sherwin E & Weston GJ 1966, Chemistry of the Non-metallic Elements, Pergamon Press, Oxford
 Shiell et al. 2021, "Bulk crystalline 4H-silicon through a metastable allotropic transition", Physical Review Letters, vol. 26, p 215701, 
 Shkol’nikov EV 2010, "Thermodynamic characterization of the amphoterism of oxides M2O3 (M = As, Sb, Bi) and their hydrates in aqueous media, Russian Journal of Applied Chemistry, vol. 83, no. 12, pp. 2121–2127, 
 Sidorov TA 1960, "The connection between structural oxides and their tendency to glass formation", Glass and Ceramics, vol. 17, no. 11, 
 Siekierski S & Burgess J 2002, Concise Chemistry of the Elements, Horwood Press, Chichester, 
 Smith A & Dwyer C 1991, Key Chemistry: Investigating Chemistry in the Contemporary World: Book 1: Materials and Everyday Life, Melbourne University Press, Carlton, Victoria, 
 Smits et al. 2020, Oganesson: A noble gas element that is neither noble nor a gas, Angewandte Chemie International Edition, vol. 59, pp. 23636–23640, 
 Stein L 1969, "Oxidized radon in halogen fluoride solutions", Journal of the American Chemical Society, vol. 19, no. 19, 
 Stein L 1983, "The chemistry of radon", Radiochimica Acta, vol. 32, 
 Stellman JM (ed.) 1998, Encyclopaedia of Occupational Health and Safety, vol. 4, 4th ed., International Labour Office, Geneva, 
 Steudel R 1977, Chemistry of the Non-metals: With an Introduction to atomic Structure and Chemical Bonding, Walter de Gruyter, Berlin, 
 Steudel R & Eckert B 2003, "Solid sulfur allotropes", in Steudel R (ed.), Elemental Sulfur and Sulfur-rich Compounds I, Springer-Verlag, Berlin, 
 Steudel R 2020, Chemistry of the Non-metals: Syntheses - Structures - Bonding - Applications, in collaboration with D Scheschkewitz, Berlin, Walter de Gruyter, 
 Still B 2016 The secret life of the periodic table, Cassell, London, 
 Stott RWA 1956, Companion to Physical and Inorganic Chemistry, Longmans, Green and Co, London
 Stuke J 1974, 'Optical and electrical properties of selenium', in RA Zingaro & WC Cooper (eds), Selenium, Van Nostrand Reinhold, New York, pp. 174
 Strathern P 2000, Mendeleyev's dream: The Quest for the Elements, Hamish Hamilton, London, 
 Su et al. 2020, "Advances in photonics of recently developed Xenes", Nanophotonics, vol. 9, no. 7, 
 Suresh CH & Koga NA 2001, "A consistent approach toward atomic radii”, Journal of Physical Chemistry A, vol. 105, no. 24. 
 Tang et al. 2021, "Synthesis of paracrystalline diamond", Nature, vol. 599, pp. 605–610, 
 Taniguchi M, Suga S, Seki M, Sakamoto H, Kanzaki H, Akahama Y, Endo S, Terada S & Narita S 1984, 'Core-exciton induced resonant photoemission in the covalent semiconductor black phosphorus', Solid State Communications, vo1. 49, no. 9, pp. 867–7, 
 Taylor MD 1960, First Principles of Chemistry, Van Nostrand, Princeton
 The Chemical News and Journal of Physical Science 1864, "Notices of books: Manual of the Metalloids", vol. 9, p. 22
 The Chemical News and Journal of Physical Science 1897, "Notices of books: A Manual of Chemistry, Theoretical and Practical", by WA Tilden", vol. 75, pp. 188–189
 Thornton BF & Burdette SC 2010, "Finding eka-iodine: Discovery priority in modern times", Bulletin for the history of chemistry, vol. 35, no. 2, accessed September 14, 2021
 Tregarthen L 2003, Preliminary Chemistry, Macmillan Education: Melbourne, 
 Trenberth KE & Smith L 2005, "The mass of the atmosphere: A constraint on global analyses", Journal of Climate, vol. 18, no. 6, 
 Tshitoyan et al. 2019, "Unsupervised word embeddings capture latent knowledge from materials science literature", Nature, vol. 571, 
 Tyler PM 1948, From the Ground Up: Facts and Figures of the Mineral Industries of the United States, McGraw-Hill, New York
 Vassilakis AA, Kalemos A & Mavridis A 2014, "Accurate first principles calculations on chlorine fluoride ClF and its ions ClF±", Theoretical Chemistry Accounts, vol. 133, no. 1436, 
 Vernon R 2013, "Which elements are metalloids?", Journal of Chemical Education, vol. 90, no. 12, 1703‒1707, 
 Vernon R 2020, "Organising the metals and nonmetals", Foundations of Chemistry, vol. 22,  (open access)
 Wächtershäuser G 2014, "From chemical invariance to genetic variability", in Weigand W and Schollhammer P (eds.), Bioinspired Catalysis: Metal Sulfur Complexes, Wiley-VCH, Weinheim, 
 Wakeman TH 1899, "Free thought—Past, present and future", Free Thought Magazine, vol. 17
 Wasewar KL 2021, "Intensifying approaches for removal of selenium", in Devi et al. (eds), Selenium contamination in water, John Wiley & Sons, Hoboken, pp. 319–355, 
 Weeks ME 1945, Discovery of the Elements, 5th ed., Journal of Chemical Education, Easton, Pennsylvania
 Welcher SH 2001, High marks: Regents Chemistry Made Easy, 2nd ed., High Marks Made Easy, New York, 
 Wells AF 1984, Structural Inorganic Chemistry, 5th ed., Clarendon Press, Oxford, 
 White JH 1962, Inorganic Chemistry: Advanced and Scholarship Levels, University of London Press, London
 Wiberg N 2001, Inorganic Chemistry, Academic Press, San Diego, 
 Williams RPJ 2007, "Life, the environment and our ecosystem", Journal of Inorganic Biochemistry, vol. 101, nos. 11–12, 
 Woodward et al. 1999, "The electronic structure of metal oxides", In Fierro JLG (ed.), Metal Oxides: Chemistry and Applications, CRC Press, Boca Raton, 
 Wulfsberg G 1987, Principles of Descriptive Chemistry, Brooks/Cole, Belmont CA, 
 Wulfsberg G 2000, Inorganic Chemistry, University Science Books, Sausalito, California, 
 Yamaguchi M & Shirai Y 1996, "Defect structures", in Stoloff NS & Sikka VK (eds.), Physical Metallurgy and Processing of Intermetallic Compounds, Chapman & Hall, New York, 
 Yang J 2004, 'Theory of thermal conductivity', in Tritt TM (ed.), Thermal Conductivity: Theory, Properties, and Applications, Kluwer Academic/Plenum Publishers, New York, pp. 1–20, 
 Yoder CH, Suydam FH & Snavely FA 1975, Chemistry, 2nd ed, Harcourt Brace Jovanovich, New York, 
 Young JA 2006, "Iodine", Journal of Chemical Education, vol. 83, no. 9, 
 Young et al. 2018, General Chemistry: Atoms First, Cengage Learning: Boston, 
 Yousuf M 1998, "Diamond anvil cells in high-pressure studies of semiconductors", in Suski T & Paul W (eds.), High Pressure in Semiconductor Physics II, Semiconductors and Semimetals, vol. 55, Academic Press, San Diego, 
 Zhao J, Tu Z & Chan SH 2021, Carbon corrosion mechanism and mitigation strategies in a proton exchange membrane fuel cell (PEMFC): A review, Journal of Power Sources, vol. 488, #229434, 
 Zhao Z, Zhang H, Kim D. et al. 2017, "Properties of the exotic metastable ST12 germanium allotrope", Nature Communications, vol. 8, article no. 13909, 
 Zhigal'skii GP & Jones BK 2003, The Physical Properties of Thin Metal Films, Taylor & Francis, London, 
 Zhu et al. 2014, "Reactions of xenon with iron and nickel are predicted in the Earth's inner core", Nature Chemistry, vol. 6, 
 Zumdahl SS & DeCoste DJ 2010, Introductory Chemistry: A Foundation,'' 7th ed., Cengage Learning, Mason, Ohio,

External links
 

 
Periodic table